Carre's Grammar School is a selective secondary school for boys in Sleaford, a market town in Lincolnshire, England.

Founded on 1 September 1604 by an indenture of Robert Carre, the school was funded by rents from farmland and run by a group of trustees. The indenture restricted the endowment to £20 without accounting for inflation, causing the school to decline during the 18th century and effectively close in 1816. Revived by a decree from the Court of Chancery in 1830 new buildings were constructed at its present site and the school reopened in 1835. Faced with declining rolls and competition from cheaper commercial schools, Carre's eventually added technical and artistic instruction to its Classical curriculum by affiliating with Kesteven County Council in 1895. Following the Education Act 1944, school fees were abolished and Carre's became Voluntary Aided. New buildings were completed in 1966 to house the rising number of pupils. After plans for comprehensive education in Sleaford came to nothing in the 1970s and 1980s, Carre's converted to grant-maintained status in 1990. Foundation status followed and the school became an Academy in 2011. The Robert Carre Trust, a multi-Academy trust with Kesteven and Sleaford High School was formed in 2015.

Admission to Carre's is through the eleven-plus examination and entry is limited to boys in the lower school, although the Sixth form is co-educational. The total number of pupils on roll in 2013 was 817, of whom 240 were in the Sixth Form. Teaching follows the National Curriculum and pupils generally sit examinations for ten or eleven General Certificate of Secondary Education (GCSE) qualifications in Year Eleven (aged 15–16). They have a choice of three or four A-levels in the sixth form, which is part of the Sleaford Joint Sixth Form consortium between Carre's, Kesteven and Sleaford High School and St George's Academy. Of the 2013 cohort, 100% of pupils achieved at least five GCSEs at grade A*-C and 96% achieved that including English and Maths GCSEs, the eighth highest percentage in Lincolnshire. An Office for Standards in Education, Children's Services and Skills (Ofsted) inspection in 2013 graded Carre's "good" overall with "outstanding" features. On 21 June 2022, a further inspection was conducted where the school received a rating of "inadequate". The Headteacher Nick Law disputed the new rating in a public letter written to Ofsted, where he claimed their judgement was "illogical and unfair".

Carre's has also created an Outreach programme in which smaller schools can be assisted financially and with sporting staff. For instance, St Andrew's Primary School in Leasingham received £8,400 in 2013. This was used to improve their general PE curriculum and play equipment for break times. The Carre's Outreach programme aims at improving: the quality of PE, competition, health/wellbeing and community spirit.

History

The first school 
Carre's Grammar School was founded on 1 September 1604 by way of an indenture between Robert Carre (a member of the Carr or Carre family) and several local gentlemen. Carre granted 100 acres of agricultural land in Gedney to these men, who held the land in trust as feoffees. The lands were estimated to be worth £40 per annum and the indenture stipulated that £20 of this would be paid to the school master, while the remainder would be for the benefit of the town's poor. The indenture stated that the school was to provide for "the better education of the Youth and Children born or inhabiting with their parents within New Sleaford, Old Sleaford, Aswarby, and Holdingham ... and in Quarrington, North Rauceby, South Rauceby, Anwick, Kirkby la Thorpe and Evedon." It is not known whether there was any other school in the town prior to the foundation of Carre's, although the indenture appointed Anthony Brown, already a schoolmaster, as the master; it thus seems likely that Carre already operated a school and his indenture codified pre-existing arrangements.

Throughout the 1620s the trustees reported problems receiving rents from the tenants in Gedney. Although the school received a bequest from a local gentleman, Robert Cammock, in 1631, which provided an additional income of £4 per annum, no more followed; the English Civil War also disrupted funding: rents were not collected between 1644 and 1646. These financial problems were compounded by the nature of the land itself: it was agricultural and not urban, thus it did not increase in value significantly in the 17th century. Carre's lagged behind other schools and its buildings fell into disrepair as the fixed endowment failed to keep up with inflation (despite the Gedney lands increasing in value to £180 by the early 19th century). In 1783, the foeffees (by then, often called trustees) spent £50 on improvements, but by 1794, the adjacent Carre's Hospital agreed that part of its building be pulled down to make way for a new schoolhouse. This did not materialise and pupils were taught in the vestry at St Denys' Church by the early 19th century. In 1816, the trustees discontinued the master's salary because there were "no duties to perform" at the school.

Revival, stagnation and modernisation 
The trustees met in 1821 and agreed that "much good" could come from reviving the school. In 1828 they petitioned the Court of Chancery for a scheme, which was approved in 1830, providing the master with a salary of £80 per annum. Four years later, the Chancery agreed to fund the rebuilding of the school at a site on Northgate. With the buildings complete, the school reopened on 1 August 1835.

Carre's maintained roughly 20 pupils on roll throughout the 1840s, but by 1858, this had fallen to two free scholars and two boarders. When the charity commissioners inspected the school the following year, they recommended that an usher be appointed to teach "commercial education" to supplement the Classics. In 1869 the Schools Enquiry Commission reported a "general dissatisfaction in the town" towards the school, finding "indifferent" discipline along with poor spelling, an inability to decline simple Latin nouns, and a low level of arithmetic. According to the report, the "general wish in the town is for a commercial school". Competition soon arose in the form of Mr Boyer's academy and later E. R. Dibben's commercial school at Mount Pleasant, Sleaford. Although the trustees were reorganised in 1876, Britain's agriculture suffered from foreign competition in the 1880s, which contributed to a decline in the rolls; a subsequent reduction of fees in 1889 proved ineffective and only twelve boys were in attendance the following year.

The Commissioner of Inquiries suggested that Kesteven County Council could support the teaching of art, modern languages and technical and scientific subjects through the Local Taxation Act 1890. In 1895 the governors agreed to affiliate with the Council, which granted them £35. The headmaster, Samuel Brown, appointed an assistant master and his wife was employed to teach art. The numbers rose so that in 1897 there were 33 pupils on roll, and the Committee granted a further £400 to pay for new accommodation and resources. The Governors, however, applied for £1,500 to build a new school entirely but the Council wanted it to be coeducational, which caused a lengthy stalemate. The demand for a coeducational school disappeared in 1902 when Sleaford and Kesteven High School for Girls opened as a private venture and so in 1904 a new building opened at Carre's, financed in part by the sale of the Gedney lands, while boarding accommodation followed in 1906. Following the Education Act 1902, Carre's received an allocation of £200 per pupil from the Board of Education, plus local authority assistance made in return for admitting pupils from local elementary schools. From 1919, elementary school pupils sat the entrance exam each term and those who passed were allocated the places which remained after fee-paying students had enrolled.

Post-war expansion and the comprehensive debate 

The Education Act 1944 made secondary education available to all children up to the age of 15 and abolished fees for state-schooling; a "tripartite system" of secondary schooling was established to provide curricula based on aptitude and ability: grammar schools for "academic" pupils, secondary moderns for practical studies, and technical schools for science and engineering. Pupils were allocated to them depending on their score in the eleven-plus examination. Carre's became a Voluntary Controlled Grammar School; from 1945 all entry was by the County Selection Examination. By 1955, the school had 330 pupils on roll and the need for new accommodation was met in the 1950s and 1960s by a major building programme at the Northgate site; completed in 1966, this added dedicated classroom blocks, a canteen and hall.

The educational opportunities for secondary modern pupils were limited compared to those at grammar schools, prompting criticism of the tripartite system. In 1965, the Labour Government issued Circular 10/65 requesting Local Education Authorities implement comprehensive schooling. In 1971 Sleaford parents voted in favour of comprehensive education, but rejected the Council's proposals. A new plan which envisaged Carre's becoming a sixth form college was supported by parents in a vote (1,199 to 628), albeit with a 50% turnout; the County Council approved it but allowed governors a veto. Following negotiations with governors at Carre's, the scheme was revised so that Carre's would be an 11–18 school and adsorb Sleaford Secondary Modern's Church Lane site. Despite support from most staff and all three headteachers, Lincolnshire County Council voted to return the scheme for consultation in 1975. A new system was proposed which retained all three schools, and when the Government ordered the Council to choose a comprehensive scheme in 1977 it submitted that proposal, which had become popular with parents. The next year the government dismissed it on grounds that the Sixth Forms would be too small, but the council voted against the two-school system once more.

Grant-maintained status and Academy conversion 

The 1979 general election brought a Conservative government to power and allowed the Council to shift its focus towards retaining Grammar Schools where they still existed and improving schools where work had been put on hold during the comprehensive debate; despite 90% of English councils adopting comprehensive education, Lincolnshire had retained many of its grammar schools. Although the County Council began discussing the abolition of them again in 1985, opposition from parents at a public consultation in 1987 resulted in the plans being dropped. With the question of its future resolved, Carre's applied for grant-maintained status in 1989; the Education Secretary approved the proposals and formally granted the status in September 1990. When grant-maintained status was abolished in 1999, Carre's became a Foundation School. Following a successful bid to the DfES, submitted in 2002, the school was granted specialist Sports College status in 2003. An all-weather pitch was laid out in 2007, and a new technology building with a fitness suite opened in 2011. In 2009, Carre's became a specialist Science College and a lead school for gifted and talented students. The school converted to Academy status in 2011. In 2014, the governors announced their intention to bid for conversion to a multi-Academy trust and become a coeducational, selective school on a new site; in February 2015, Kesteven and Sleaford High School announced its intention to join the proposed trust, a moved welcomed by Carre's. Carre's officially became part of the Robert Carre Multi-Academy Trust on 1 September 2015; the schools continue to operate on their sites, sharing staff and facilities.

School structure 
Carre's is a state-run selective grammar school. It converted to an Academy and reopened on 1 August 2011; it is governed by The Robert Carre Trust and converted without sponsorship. As of 2015, the student body is made up of 815 pupils aged 11–18. The school admits boys on a selective basis for years 7–11 and has a co-educational Sixth Form; there are 60 girls on roll as of 2015. The majority of pupils come from White British backgrounds and very few pupils speak English as an additional language. The number of pupils supported through allowances, including those eligible for free school meals (2.3%), is below average, as is the number of students with learning disabilities. Pupils are allocated into houses based on their forms. The first house system at Carre's consisted of four sets: scarlet, maroon, green and blue. They became houses in 1933 as Carre, Bristol, Lafford and Welby, named respectively after its founder, the Earls of Bristol, an old name for Sleaford, and Richard Welby, who owned the Gedney lands purchased by Carre.

Admission to the school is through the eleven-plus examination, taken in year 6. Pupils must obtain a minimum score before their application will be considered and places will be awarded based on whether the child is in public care, whether he lives in the catchment area and attends a partnered primary school, and whether they have siblings attending the school or parents working there. In the event of a tie, places will be allocated based on proximity to the school. The school has a maximum annual intake of 116 at the start of year 7 (aged 11); pupils are arranged into forms of no more than 30, where registration takes place. Their form tutors provide access to pastoral support, overseen by their Key Stage Manager. In 2013 the lower school had approximately 577 pupils on roll. The school uniform consists of a black blazer with the school badge embroidered on the breast pocket and a red braid on each pocket. Black trousers are worn along with a white shirt and school tie.

The vast majority of pupils at Carre's continue on to the Sixth Form, and there were 240 students on roll in 2013. Along with Kesteven & Sleaford High School and St George's Academy, Carre's is part of the Sleaford Joint Sixth Form, which was founded in 1983. It provides a common timetable across school sites and allows for pupils to choose from A-Level options offered at all three schools. Pupils may apply to be based at either school, where their pastoral and tutorial activities take place. There are entry requirements based on GCSE attainment. Sixth Formers can apply to be prefects, who have responsibilities around the school under the supervision of staff. The students are required to wear business-dress; for males, this consists of a dark suit, a "non-vivid" shirt and the school's sixth form tie; females must dress in "smart business wear".

Curriculum
The curriculum during the 17th and 18th centuries is not known for certain. In 1714 the trustees agreed that the pupils should attend church services at St Denys' Church six days a week; whether this was adhered to is not clear. Religious practice was a stipulation in the 1835 decree, which required pupils to pray at the start and end of each day and engage in daily readings of holy scriptures. However, the emphasis was always on classical education, which likely required instruction in Latin from the earliest times; in 1835, learning the classics was enshrined as the school's primary purpose. In the mid-19th century, Carre's offered this classical education for free, but arithmetic, geometry and algebra were taught as extras at a rate of two guineas per term. Students were enrolled from the age of eight, and were expected to be able to read, write, recite the Lord's Prayer, the Apostles' Creed and the Ten Commandments, and "be qualified to begin Latin grammar". Students had to supply their own equipment, except pens and ink, which were covered by a 10 shilling payment made each term to the school. The school's inspection in 1865 mentions geography and history teaching, although the general standard of attainment was low.

In 1876, the curriculum was widened so that it comprised reading, writing, arithmetic, English, mathematics, history, geography, Latin, a foreign language, music, natural science and drawing, with Greek as an optional extra. The County Council supported technical and commercial subjects in the late 19th century, but after 1904 it was empowered to support secondary education in general, allowing Latin and other classical components of the curriculum to remain intact. After World War I, sixth form courses were developed allowing students to commence advanced studies in the arts and sciences. By the 1950s, a wide range were available: English language and literature, mathematics, French, German, Latin, Greek, art, history, geography, physics, chemistry and woodwork; biology was taught at Kesteven and Sleaford High School.

Key Stages 3 and 4 
As of 2014, the school follows the National Curriculum in years 7–11 and offers a range of GCSEs (national exams taken by students aged 14–16) and A-levels (national exams taken by pupils aged 16–18). The school has no affiliation with a particular religious denomination, but religious education is given throughout the school, and boys may opt to take the subject as part of their GCSE course. Although morning assemblies take place and are Christian in nature, they are non-denominational. Students participate in a number of educational visits and excursions throughout their school career and year 12 students are offered the opportunity to participate in a work experience programme. The curriculum comprises English, mathematics, French, history, geography, science, art, music, design and technology, information communications technology (I.C.T.), ethics and philosophy (religious education), physical education (P.E.), cookery, and citizenship, sex and relationships education; in Key Stage 4 (years 10 and 11), pupils also participate in careers and work-related learning. In mathematics, students are divided by their ability into four bands. Science is divided into Biology, Chemistry and Physics in year 9. The use of information technology is central to all teaching and is taught as a subject in Key Stage 3 and pupils may opt to take Computer Science as a GCSE.

Boys usually take nine or ten subjects for GCSE: English (language and literature), mathematics, a foreign language, all three separate sciences or Dual Certificate Science, as well as three other subjects from those listed above as well as business studies, with technology being divided into separate courses for Resistant Materials, Graphics, Electronics and Engineering; Mandarin is also available as an optional extra subject but is studied after school.

Sixth Form 
The Robert Carre Trust and St. George's Academy operate the Sleaford Joint Sixth Form, which shares a common timetable between the three sites and allows for students to choose from a wide range of options at A-Level. Students may choose to apply to be based at either school, where their pastoral and tutorial activities will take place. The Sixth Form, including Carre's and KSHS, is co-educational. The majority of students take three A-levels subjects, for which their study is completed over the two years. The Sleaford Joint Sixth Form allows students to choose from a range of 65 optional vocational or academic subjects including: art and photography (separate A-Level or BTEC options), applied Science, biology, bricklaying, business (A-Level or BTEC), childcare, carpentry, chemistry, computer science, ICT (A-Level or BTEC), drama or performing arts (A-Level or BTEC), electronics, engineering, English (language and/or literature), film or media studies, French, German, geography, government and politics, health and social care, history, hospitality and catering, law, mathematics and further mathematics, music (A-Level or BTEC), philosophy and ethics, psychology, physical education or sport (A-Level or BTEC), physics, product design, public services, light vehicle maintenance, Spanish, sociology, travel and tourism, and work skills. In addition, students may participate in a range of extra-curricular activities, including the Duke of Edinburgh Award scheme.

Examinations 
In 2013, 100% of pupils achieved at least five GCSEs at grade A*–C and 96% achieved that including English and Maths GCSEs, the eighth highest percentage in Lincolnshire. Figures for the 2010/11 cohort show that 86% of Key Stage 4 pupils at the school carried on to the Sixth Form. At A-Level, 85% of pupils in 2013 attained three A-Levels at grades A*–E and 11% achieved three A-Levels at grades AAB including at least two "facilitating subjects"; the average point score per qualification was 201.7, equating to a C− grade, and the average point score per student was 823.1. The Sunday Times ranked Carre's 101st (49th amongst state schools) in the Midlands and 750th nationally based on A-Level and GCSE performance in 2012; it recorded that 48.7% of A-Levels were at A*–B grade and 42.5% of GCSE grades were at A* or A.

Extra-curricular activities 
As of 2014, school clubs and societies include various language clubs, sport clubs, musical activities and many others. Students may participate in the Duke of Edinburgh's Award Scheme, beginning with the Bronze grade in year 10. Musical opportunities include participating in the school band and the choir, the guitar club and the Music Theory support group; the school band has performed at the Lincolnshire Show and music students have taken part in the Lincolnshire School's Prom in Skegness. In the past, Carre's has offered a range of clubs and societies, including ones for archaeology, aero-building, bird-watching, boxing, chess, cycling, drama, languages, geography, jazz and other music groups, a choir and orchestra, and student voice groups, like the student council. The first school play performed by the Dramatic Society was She Stoops to Conquer in 1938. Trips to see plays, a Play Reading Society and a new dramatic society were formed under the guidance of the English master A. D. Winterburn. In 1968, plays were performed jointly with Kesteven and Sleaford High School. At the end of World War I, a cadet corps as formed by one Captain Price and became part of the Army Cadet Corps under the War Office; attendance at weekly parades was compulsory for pupils over 13 in the 1920s. Most pupils took part in its activities in World War II, under the lead of the History teacher, Major W. H. T. Walker; this included athletics competitions, shooting practice and trips to camp sites. It disbanded in c. 1963 when the two staff who ran it retired.

Sport 
As with the curriculum, there are no references to sports being played at Carre's before the 19th century. In 1835, the Marquis of Bristol allowed the school to use an acre of land, which probably functioned as a playground. Sports fields were not added to the grounds until 1908, but the earliest reports of the school participating in sporting events pre-date this by half a century. In the 1860s, the Sleaford Gazette reported on cricket matches with local schools, namely the rival academies run by Mr Boyer and Mr Dibben in Sleaford; by the 1890s, these matches were being organised with more distant schools, like the grammar school at Grantham. Athletics were practised at the school as early as 1871 when a sports day was held; the 100 yards and half a mile races, hurdles, the pole jump and throwing the cricket ball were activities in which forms competed. Football was played at the school as early as 1895. Glebe land was acquired in 1908 for sporting purposes and levelled in the early 1930s. A cycling club was formed in the 1940s and badminton was informally organised by pupils by the 1950s; between 1957 and 1960, a portion of land was converted into tennis courts for the school and rugby was introduced in the 1966–67 academic year.

In 2014–15, the school pitched football, rugby union, basketball, cricket, golf and netball teams. In football, the under 12, 13, 14 and 15 football teams won the Kesteven and Sleaford District leagues in 2013/14, while the under 13 and 14 teams won the Lincolnshire Schools' Cup. In rugby, the under 14 team was county champions for the same season and the school competes on a national level.

On 8 May 2019, the school was represented by 16 year 11s in the English Schools FA Boys Under 16s Premier League Elite Schools Cup, they proceeded to win against Shropshire school Thomas Telford at Manchester City's FA Academy Stadium in which the win was decided by a penalty shootout. “In truth the whole squad did their job on the day,” said Carre’s head of sport, James Offer. “All 16 players played their part in the win."

English 
In 2021-22, the school took part in the National Rotary Youth Speaks Competition which involved a team of 3 creating and debating a subject of their choice. These subjects ranged from tobacco products to the 'super rich'. After placing joint first in the Sleaford round, the team placed 2nd in Senior District Final in Grantham, against St George’s Academy, Stamford High School, and the hosts of this round – Priory Ruskin Academy. The Senior District Final was held 12 March, 2022.

Site and property

The original location of Carre's School is not known. From 1653, it operated in buildings on Eastgate, adjacent to Carre's Hospital. After these fell into disrepair in the late 18th century, pupils were taught in the vestry of St Denys' Church until the school was closed in 1816. In 1826, the trustees purchased a house on Northgate at the cost of £545 3s. from one Mr Squires. In 1834, the Chancery Court agreed to fund the rebuilding of the school according to plans by the Sleaford architect and builder Charles Kirk, who constructed it at a cost £1,168 15s. The building is in the Tudor Gothic style and built in Ashlar stone with slate roofs. It has three stories of three bays, with the upper floor housed in two gables. A shield with the arms of the Marquis of Bristol and his wife are located above the four-centre arch doorway. Single-storey wings exist on either side in a similar style. Brick additions were made in 1904 and 1906.

As the school roll grew, the old buildings became too small. A major building programme began in the 1950s: £128,000 was set aside to rehouse the school in purpose-built facilities adjacent to the existing school-houses. The first phase was opened in 1956 and included art and handicraft rooms; the second phase was completed in 1958 when physics and chemistry rooms were added; and the third came in 1965 with the opening of new biology and general science laboratories alongside other classrooms, while the following year saw a new hall/canteen and kitchen open. The final phase consisted of eight further rooms, built shortly afterwards.

A grant of £650,000 funded the construction of a technology centre with a computer suite, which opened in January 1993. Plans for a new sports hall were first discussed in 1990, but they only came to fruition in 1996, when Northgate Sports Hall opened. The Sports Council and the Foundation for Sport and the Arts donated £250,000 towards its construction; this was matched by North Kesteven District Council, while Carre's raised £50,000 towards the building work. An all-weather pitch at the school opened in 2007; it cost £649,000 to lay, half of which was met by the Football Foundation. A building programme costing £835,000 provided the school with food technology facilities and a two-storey Fitness Suite, which were opened in March 2011. As of 2022, the food technology facilities are unused and the room now supports the Sleaford Joint Sixth Form in study work.

Headmasters 
The indenture of 1604 made it compulsory that the master be a graduate of the University of Cambridge or Oxford and the majority of the pre-1835 masters had attended Cambridge, with only two from Oxford. When the school reopened in 1835, these stipulations were removed. The headmaster lived on site until Derek Lee began commuting from his home in 1975. The list below contains the names, years of service and biographical notes about the known headmasters of Carre's since its foundation. The current headmaster is Nick Law, who succeeded Mike Reading in 2008.

Source:  provides a list of all masters, and a record of their education, up to 1954. He notes that W. H. T. Walker and J. H. Batley acted as headmaster between appointments in the 1940s.

Notable alumni
Carre's has produced a number of notable alumni in a range of fields and professions. In politics, this includes Sir Robert Pattinson (1872–1954), member of parliament and chairman of Kesteven County Council, and his brother Samuel (1870–1942), also a member of parliament and businessman. The diplomat Peter Bateman (b. 1955), who served as the British ambassador to Bolivia, Luxembourg and Azerbaijan, was also a pupil at the school. Carrensians in the military include Air Marshal Barry North (b. 1959) and Captain George Baldwin, CBE, DSO (1921–2005), who served in World War II and as Director of Naval Air Warfare in the mid-1960s. The lawyer and controversialist John Austin (1613–1669) was educated at Carre's, along with the Royalist poet Thomas Shipman (1632–1680) and the non-conformist clergyman Andrew Kippis, FRS (1725–1795). Science is represented by the chemist Kenneth Wade, FRS (1932–2014), a professor at Durham University, and the forensic pathologist Iain West (1944–2001). In sports, the school has produced at least two professional footballers: Paul Holland (b. 1973), who played for Mansfield Town, Sheffield United, Chesterfield and Bristol City, and Mark Wallington (b. 1952), who played for England under 23s and Leicester City as well as at least one professional rugby player, Ollie Chessum (b. 2000), who plays for Leicester Tigers and who made his England International debut against Italy in the 2022 Six Nations.

References

Citations

Bibliography

External links
 Carre's Grammar School
 EduBase

Educational institutions established in the 1600s
Grammar schools in Lincolnshire
North Kesteven District
1604 establishments in England
Academies in Lincolnshire

Sleaford